The Jean Piaget Society is an international learned society dedicated to studying human knowledge from a developmental perspective. It is named after the highly regarded developmental psychologist Jean Piaget. Since 1989, its full name has been the Jean Piaget Society: Society for the Study of Knowledge and Development. It was established in 1970 by Temple University professor Lois Macomber in Philadelphia, Pennsylvania. The Society is based in Media, Pennsylvania, and its current president is David Witherington. It sponsors a book series, an annual meeting, and the peer-reviewed journal 
Human Development, which is the Society's official journal. The book series, entitled the "Jean Piaget Symposium Series", is based on the Society's annual meetings. It was published by Lawrence Erlbaum Associates for over thirty years.

Annual conferences

The occasion of our 50th anniversary provides a unique and timely opportunity to both celebrate the birth and history of the Jean Piaget Society and critically examine Piaget’s enduring contributions to contemporary developmental scholarship and practice. The 2021 conference focuses on constructivism, a foundational tenet of Piaget’s theory and the School of Geneva.

Our invited program will explore both science and culture as active, transformative, historical processes and practices, with deep and far-reaching implications for understanding human development and knowledge: the processes and practices of science are woven into what is considered to be truth and knowledge, and what is valued with respect to how human development is studied and to what effect; those of culture—from daily routines to institutionalized practices (e.g., in education)—become tools with which developing individuals construct realities, knowledge, and value commensurate with personal and relational histories.

An interdisciplinary cast of invited speakers will provide an overview of different constructivist approaches (including Vygotsky’s); address the relevance of constructivism to the burgeoning fields of epigenetics and neurodevelopment, with special reference to the longstanding nature-nurture controversy; critique the ongoing dialogue about constructivist education and policy; and explore implications of constructivism for understanding developmental diversities. The history of the Jean Piaget Society will be showcased in a variety of displays and special sessions during the first day of the virtual meeting.

Past presidents
Marilyn Appel,
Terrance Brown,
Nancy Budwig,
Michael Chandler,
Colette Daiute,
Kurt Fischer,
George Forman,
Lynn Liben,
Lois Macomber,
John A. Meacham,
John Mickelson,
Frank Murray,
Larry Nucci,
Willis Overton (Honorary Member},
Barbara Presseisen (Honorary Member),
Peter Pufall,
Geoffrey Saxe,
Ellin K. Scholnick,
Irving Sigel,
Elliot Turiel,
David Witherington,
Robert Wozniak,
Phil Zelazo.

References

External links

Organizations established in 1970
1970 establishments in Pennsylvania
International professional associations
Psychology organizations based in the United States
Organizations based in Pennsylvania